Faith, Hope and Witchcraft is a 1960 Danish family film directed by Erik Balling and starring Bodil Ipsen. It was entered into the 10th Berlin International Film Festival.

Cast

 Bodil Ipsen - Bedstemor Gunhild
 Gunnar Lauring - Jonas
 Louis Miehe-Renard - Enok
 Peter Malberg - Peter
 Poul Reichhardt - Rubanus
 Birte Bang - Eva
 Berthe Qvistgaard - Sally
 Jakob Nielsen - Huskarlen Jacob
 Hanne Winther-Jørgensen - Bruden
 Oscar Hermansen - Brudgommen
 Poul Müller - Præsten
 Freddy Koch - Sysselmanden
 Børge Møller Grimstrup - Nystuebonden
 Ole Larsen - Gammelstuebonden
 Kjeld Jacobsen - Bestyrer på Hvalfangerstationen
 Carl Ottosen - Nicolajsen
 Victor Montell
 Valsø Holm - Hotelejer
 Gunnar Strømvad
 Ernst Schou
 Sjurdur Patursson
 Frazer Eysturoy
 Else Kornerup
 Henry Lohmann
 Axel Strøbye - Vred mand
 Vilhelm Henriques
 Flemming Dyjak - Ung mand
 John Hahn-Petersen - Bartender
 Edith Hermansen
 Edith Trane
 Bertel Lauring
 Bjørn Spiro - Betjent

References

External links

1960 films
Danish children's films
1960s Danish-language films
Films directed by Erik Balling
Films with screenplays by Erik Balling